The president of the Senate of Ceylon, was the presiding officer and the highest ranking-official of the Senate of Ceylon.

The president of the Senate was the fourth most senior position in the government, following the governor general, the prime minister and the chief justice.

The Senate was created on 1947 with the abolition of the Soulbury Commission as the upper house with the House of Representatives of Ceylon as the lower house. The position of president was created under clause 16 of the Ceylon (Constitution) Order in Council, 1947, which required the Senate at its first constituted meeting to elect two senators to the role of president and deputy president. The position becoming vacant when the president either resigned or ceased to be a senator. The president had the casting vote in the event of a tied vote in the senate.

List of Senate presidents
The first president was Sir Gerard Wijeyekoon, who was elected at the first sitting of the senate on 14 October 1947. Following Wijeyekoon's death on 21 September 1952 Sir Nicholas Attygalle was elected to the position of president in October that year, less than a year after he was appointed to the senate. On 18 January 1955 Attygalle resigned from the senate to take up a position as the vice chancellor of the University of Ceylon. Sir Cyril de Zoysa was elected as president and Lady Adeline Molamure as deputy president on 15 February 1955.

See also
 Senate of Ceylon

References

External links
Evolution of the Parliamentary System, parliament.lk

 
Senator of Ceylon